Los Hispanos is a Colombian band founded in 1964. By Jairo Jimenez jaramillo  Their main vocalist was Gustavo Quintero who later retired from the band to form his own group "Los Graduados". That's when he was replaced by Rodolfo Aicardi. Other band members included Piter Botina, René Cárdenas, Jorge Laun, Jorge Grajales, Body Esmall, Tony Contreras, Jorge Restrepo (aka as J .R. Quintero), Mario Sánchez, Jaime Ley, Cesar Augusto,  Jairo Jiménez and the Ecuadorian Gustavo Velázquez.

References

Colombian musical groups